James Rankin Ferguson (3 January 1908 – 20 November 1975) was an Australian politician who represented the South Australian House of Assembly seats of Goyder from 1970 to 1973 and Yorke Peninsula from 1963 to 1970 for the Liberal and Country League.

References

 

1908 births
1975 deaths
Members of the South Australian House of Assembly
Liberal and Country League politicians
20th-century Australian politicians